Lecithocera immobilis is a moth in the family Lecithoceridae. It was described by Edward Meyrick in 1918. It is found in southern India.

The wingspan is about 13 mm. The forewings are dark fuscous, slightly tinged with purple. The stigmata are darker, cloudy and obscure, the plical beneath the first discal. The hindwings are grey whitish.

References

Moths described in 1918
immobilis